Salomé Saqué (born 10 May 1995 Lagny-sur-Marne), is a French journalist.

Life 
Salomé Saqué was born in Seine-et-Marne then grew up in Ardèche. She went to the high school in Aubenas.

After the baccalaureate, she took drama lessons at the Lyon Conservatory and played in various plays.

At the same time, she followed a Khâgne at the Édouard-Herriot high school in Lyon, and continued at university with a double degree in political science and English. She then participated in an Erasmus in Spain, at the Complutense University of Madrid.

She holds a Masters in international law and another Masters in bilingual journalism.

Career 
She began working for Le Monde diplomatique as well as France 24 for three years.

She gained visibility thanks to her coverage for the online media, The Wind Rises of the Yellow Vests movement, as well as a correspondent for an Australian television channel. For Le Monde, her success is notably due to her ability to capture attention on social networks. On the other hand, she testified to the harassment of which she is the victim online, because of her positions, but above all because she is a woman. She defines herself as a committed journalist but not as an activist journalist.

She joined Denis Robert's information site, Blast, when it was created in 2021. She is also a columnist in political magazines like Ça vous regard on LCP or the program 28 minutes on Arte. One of her October 2021 columns urging the fight against global warming, reminiscent of the scene from Don't Look Up, earned her a lot of notice on social media.

Since 3 September 2022, she hosts, in collaboration with hydrologist Emma Haziza, the program A degree of consciousness broadcast on Saturday mornings on France Info.

References 

1995 births
French journalists
Living people